WRLA (1490 AM) is a radio station broadcasting a classic hits format. Licensed to West Point, Georgia, United States, the station is currently owned by Tiger Communications, Inc. and features programming from ABC Radio.

History
The station went on the air as WDWZ on 8 March 1996. On 6 December 2002, the station changed its call sign to the current WRLA.

References

External links

RLA